The men's 200 metre individual medley event at the 2014 Asian Games took place on 22 September 2014 at Munhak Park Tae-hwan Aquatics Center.

Schedule
All times are Korea Standard Time (UTC+09:00)

Records

Results
Legend
DNS — Did not start
DSQ — Disqualified

Heats

Final

References

Heats Results
Final Results

External links
Official website

Swimming at the 2014 Asian Games